The Church of Jesus the Redeemer is a Roman Catholic church in the Antakalnis eldership in Vilnius, Lithuania. It was founded by the Lithuanian Grand Hetman and Voivode of Vilnius Jan Kazimierz Sapieha the Younger and the Trinitarians in 1694. Its architect is Pietro Perti, who is also the author of the nearby Church of St. Peter and St. Paul. The church, Trinitarians Monastery and the Sapieha Palace with its park formed a magnificent Baroque ensemble.

Gallery

Notes

References

 

Roman Catholic churches completed in 1717
18th-century Roman Catholic church buildings in Lithuania
Church buildings with domes
Baroque architecture in Lithuania
Roman Catholic churches in Vilnius
1717 establishments in the Polish–Lithuanian Commonwealth